Break Up Club is a 2010 Hong Kong romance film starring Jaycee Chan and Fiona Sit. This film revolves around a website that allows users to win back lost loves, so long as they agree to break up another happy couple.

Reception
The film received generally positive reviews from the Hong Kong media.

Perry Lam of Muse Magazine wrote, "Wong juggles a mixed bag of styles, including mockumentary and DIY video, and conjures up a teen romance that tries to tug at your heartstrings one moment, and make you laugh your head off the next."

Cast

References

External links
 Official website
 
 
 Far East Films - News - Trailer And Poster For 'Break Up Club'
 Break Up Club at Hong Kong Cinemagic

2010 films
2010 romance films
2010s Cantonese-language films
Films directed by Wong Chun-chun
Hong Kong romance films
Films set in Hong Kong
Films shot in Hong Kong
2010s Hong Kong films